The Lockwitzbach  is a river of Saxony, Germany. It is a left tributary of the Elbe, which it joins near Dresden.

See also
List of rivers of Saxony

Rivers of Saxony
Rivers of the Ore Mountains
Rivers of Germany